Judith Wills (born 1949 - ) is a British author, food and health journalist,  magazine editor and columnist. She was born in Oxfordshire, the youngest child of a  telephone salesman and an ex-primary schoolteacher,  and was educated at the Oxford College   of  Technology (now Oxford Brookes University  . She lives on the borders of Herefordshire and Wales.

Career
In 1967, at age 17, she moved to London and became a secretary, then a writer, for the UK’s pop culture magazine Fabulous at the   end of the Swinging Sixties, and spent many years in the London  media and  show business scene.

Wills  was editor of Slimmer magazine for over 10 years and then wrote a weekly food column in The Daily Express.  She writes for several websites including Netmums and Saga and for magazines including Saga and Candis.

Her books have been published in 14 languages.  The best known book is The Food Bible, which is held by 1400 libraries according to WorldCat  

She has also written numerous related diet books, cookbooks, and an autobiography, 
Keith Moon Stole My Lipstick, published by UKA Press in 2008 and by The History Press in 2016, and held in 10 libraries according to WorldCat     The book has been featured in Women’s Weekly and Candis Magazine.

Bibliography

Non-fiction
 The Food Bible  First publish in 1998 by London : Quadrille, and  New York : Simon & Schuster Editions   Revised ed.. in 2007.  New and completely revised edition published by White Owl in February 2019 in hardback and February 2020 in paperback.
 The Diet Bible 
 Feeding Kids  Headline.
 The Green Food Bible
 The Garden to Kitchen Expert with Dr D. G. Hessayon, Transworld.
 The Children’s Food Bible
 Take Off 10 Years In 10 Weeks
 Everyday Eating for Babies and Children
 Midlife, New Life London : Quadrille.
 6 Ways to Lose a Stone in 6 Weeks 
 The  Omega Diet  
 Judith Wills’ Slimmer's Cookbook
 Judith Wills’ Virtually Vegetarian

Wills' autobiographical story Keith Moon Stole My Lipstick, about her life in her late teens and early twenties working for one of the leading pop magazines of the 60s/70s was first published by UKA Press in 2008 and then in 2016 by The History Press.

Her books have been serialized  in many UK national newspapers, including The Sunday Times, The Mail on Sunday and The Daily Mail.

Magazines and Newspapers
Wills has written for  many national magazines and newspapers, including The Times, The Daily Mail, The Mirror, Daily Express, Good Housekeeping, Woman’s Weekly, Zest, Slimming, Marie Claire, Saga Magazine and Waitrose Food Illustrated.  She has a regular blog on the Saga organisation website.

Radio and TV

Wills has starred in three Top 10 videos adapted from her books and has made many TV appearances and over 500 radio broadcasts.

References

External links
  The Diet Detective
  Judith Wills on NetMums
 Judith Wills on Saga Magazine
  Stories about People, Judith Wills the Model BBC  Hereford and Worcester 
  Diet Dilemmas, Judith Wills feature The Belfast Telegraph

1950 births
Living people
British writers